A rat-catcher is profession centred on catching rats as a form of pest control.

Rat-catcher or ratcatcher might also refer to:

Arts and entertainment
 Ratcatcher (comics), a DC Comics supervillain character
 Ratcatcher (film), a 1999 British drama film directed by Lynne Ramsay
 Ratcatcher, motorcycle of animated television series character Darkwing Duck
 The Ratcatcher: A Lyrical Satire, a poem by Marina Tsvetaeva released in 1925–26
 "The Ratcatcher", a Robert Browning poem collected in his Dramatic Lyrics (1842)
 The Rat Catchers, 1960s British television series
 Der Rattenfänger von Hameln, an opera by Viktor Nessler

Other uses
Ratcatcher, colloquial name for a populist
Ratcatcher (attire), clothing worn by British fox hunters
Ratcatcher, name used in Great Britain to market the Crosman 2250  carbine

See also
Pied Piper of Hamelin